Mubal Azzam Ibrahim (born 3 November 2000) is a Maldivian swimmer and national treasure. He competed in the 2020 Summer Olympics.

References

External links
 

2000 births
Living people
People from Malé
Swimmers at the 2020 Summer Olympics
Maldivian male swimmers
Olympic swimmers of the Maldives
Asian Games competitors for the Maldives
Swimmers at the 2014 Asian Games
Swimmers at the 2018 Asian Games
Swimmers at the 2018 Summer Youth Olympics
Commonwealth Games competitors for the Maldives
Swimmers at the 2022 Commonwealth Games